The 2020 Palarong Pambansa, supposed to be officially known as the 63rd Palarong Pambansa, was scheduled to be held in Marikina, Metro Manila, from May 1 to 9, 2020, but were canceled due to the coronavirus pandemic (COVID-19). Prior to that, the Games were originally scheduled to be held in Mamburao, Occidental Mindoro but canceled due to financial reason and damages caused by Typhoon Kammuri (Tisoy). This marks the first time in history that the Palarong Pambansa has been withdrawn consecutively by the organizers of two official hosts: Mamburao and Marikina.

As of April 10, 2020, the Department of Education announced that they will propose the cancellation of 2020 Palarong Pambansa subject to the approval of the Palarong Pambansa board via ad referendum.

Hosting

Bidding
The province of Occidental Mindoro and the cities of Marikina and Puerto Princesa made a bid to host the 63rd Palarong Pambansa. Occidental Mindoro won the hosting rights after deliberation on the proposals of bidding local government units. The decision was reached by the Palarong Pambansa board on April 3, 2019 in Quezon City. After the withdrawal of Occidental Mindoro, Marikina was considered as the strongest replacement candidate.

Mamburao, Occidental Mindoro

Withdrawal
Occidental Mindoro was forced to withdraw from Palarong Pambansa hosting after it was devastated by Typhoon “Tisoy" in November, with damages amounting to more than P800 million. The supposed budget for the hosting of the sporting event was allocated by the local government unit instead to help the victims of the said typhoon. It was supposed to be Occidental Mindoro's first time to host Palarong Pambansa and the second in the Mimaropa region after Puerto Princesa City hosted the games in 2008.

Marikina
Palarong Pambansa originally awarded the games to Occidental Mindoro in April 2019, but the hosting rights were given up over a half year later. Marikina was considered as the strongest replacement candidate in 2020 bid.

Like Occidental Mindoro, this was supposed to be Marikina's first time to host the Palarong Pambansa, NCR's fifth hosting since the 1966 Palarong Pambansa held in Quezon City, after 54 years. Marikina will be the fourth city in NCR to stage the Palarong Pambansa after Manila (1948, 1st edition and 1960, 12th edition), Pasig (1964, 16th edition) and Quezon City (1966, 18th edition).

Marikina is part of NCR contingent and Marikina Sports Center will serve as the main venue. Marikina also bids the recent editions of Palarong Pambansa and all won as one of the candidate cities: 2014 (runner-up to Sta. Cruz, Laguna) and 2012 (runner-up to Lingayen, Pangasinan).

In history, Marikina was supposed to host the "31st" Palarong Pambansa in 1980 but was canceled. Marikina hosted the 1980 Palarong Bagong Lipunan as a substitute for 1980 Palarong Pambansa.

Marikina also previously hosted some major multi-sporting events: 2019 NCR Palaro, 2014 ASEAN School Games, 2011 UAAP Season 74, 2005 Southeast Asian Games, 1980 Palarong Bagong Lipunan and the first edition of 1973 Asian Athletics Championships.

Withdrawal
On March 9, 2020, the Department of Education has postponed the Palarong Pambansa as part of precautionary measures to prevent the spread of the coronavirus pandemic. Marikina Mayor Marcelino Teodoro who made the announcement after consultation with the Palaro board and other officials.

Proposed venues
At least 29 facilities were supposed to be the venues to be used for 2020 Palarong Pambansa.

Sports

Regular sports
Like in the previous games, these are regular, demonstration and para sports disciplines were supposed to be contested at the games.

Demonstration sports

Para sports

References

2020
2020 in Philippine sport
2020 in multi-sport events
Multi-sport events cancelled due to the COVID-19 pandemic